Alfredo Sfeir Younis (born 1947) is a Chilean economist, spiritual leader and healer, President of the Zambuling Institute for Human Transformation, founded in  in Washington, DC.

Biography 
Before opening the institute, Sfeir had a twenty-nine-year career at the World Bank where he was hired as the World Bank's first environmental economist in 1976 and later was appointed Director of the World Bank Office in Geneva, Switzerland. He served as Special Representative to the United Nations and the World Trade Organization from 1996 to 1999. In both institutions Sfeir worked in the general fields of human rights, peace, and social justice; within this broader context he initiated and promoted policy in such areas as poverty eradication, international trade and finance, financing of development, gender and women's issues, trade and development, role of indigenous peoples, sustainable management of forestry and fisheries, water management and irrigation, desertification, biodiversity, culture and spirituality in sustainable development, and alternative medicine.

He has received numerous awards from international organizations, including the Lifetime Ambassador of Peace (2001), Peace and Tolerance Award (2002), World Healer Award (2002), Messenger of Peace (2002), Peace, Mercy and Tolerance Award (2003), Supreme Advisor of the Buddhist Spiritual Forum Award, World Peace Mercy and Tolerance Award (2004), Diamond Peace Award (2005), and Peace Ambassador Award (2006).

Sfeir was a candidate for the 2013 presidential election as the leader of the Green Ecologist Party, but lost the election with less than 3% of the total number of votes.

References 

 Bio of Alfredo Sfeir-Younis, Contributing writer and Advisor to Kosmos Journal
  Bio of Yogi Bhajan, Chapters: "The Man from the UN" and "Aquarian Times: The Magazine"
  Land and Soil Management: Technology, Economics, and Institutions by Alfredo Sfeir-Younis

External links 

 Official campaign web site
 Zambuling Institute for Human Transformation

1947 births
Living people
Chilean diplomats
Chilean people of Lebanese descent
Candidates for President of Chile
Chilean environmentalists
University of Chile alumni